Nils is the fifth solo studio album by Nils Lofgren.

Background 
With mainstream success continuing to elude Lofgren, A&M brought in Bob Ezrin in 1979, to oversee Nils. Ezrin was known for his successes with Alice Cooper, Pink Floyd, Lou Reed, and Kiss. Lofgren: "The label said they wanted to bring in co-writers, and I said that I didn't do that. Ezrin said, 'What about Lou Reed?' And I said, 'Well, yeah, okay. That would be cool.'" Lofgren watched a football game at Reed's Greenwich Village apartment and the two struck up a friendship. In the middle of the night Reed would call Lofgren and dictate lyrics over the phone. Their collaborations appeared across Nils and Reed's The Bells, also released in 1979. Ezrin also brought in contributions from Dick Wagner, who'd worked with Reed, Kiss, and Cooper ("Only Women Bleed" and "You And Me"). Wagner and Reed co-wrote "I'll Cry Tomorrow" a sequel of sorts to "I Never Cry" (1976) by Wagner and Cooper. With such hit makers at his side, Lofgren felt certain that Nils would be his breakthrough and that songs like "Shine Silently" would be hits.

Track listing 
All tracks composed by Nils Lofgren, except where indicated.

 "No Mercy" – 4:06
 "I'll Cry Tomorrow" (Dick Wagner, Lou Reed) – 4:28
 "Baltimore" (Randy Newman) – 6:43
 "Shine Silently" (Lofgren, Dick Wagner) – 3:48
 "Steal Away" – 4:08
 "Kool Skool" – 3:17
 "A Fool Like Me" (Lofgren, Lou Reed) – 3:11
 "I Found Her" (Lofgren, Lou Reed) – 3:36
 "You're So Easy" (Lofgren, Bob Ezrin, Dick Wagner) – 5:54

Charts

Personnel
Nils Lofgren - guitar, accordion, keyboards, vocals
Tom Lofgren - guitar, vocals
Bob Babbitt - bass
Stu Daye - guitar, vocals
Bob Ezrin - percussion, keyboards, vocals, vibraphone
Jody Linscott - percussion, congas
Doug Riley - organ on "Baltimore"
David Sanborn - saxophone on "A Fool Like Me"
Allan Schwartzberg - drums
Colina Phillips, Debbie Fleming - additional background vocals
Al MacMillan - orchestration on "Shine Silently"
Technical 
"The indispensable" Ann Martin - production coordination
George Minnis, Ilona Pring, Inez Fridenberg, T. Lawless - production assistants
Brian Christian - engineer
Len Irish - photography

Special effects on "No Mercy" recorded at Madison Square Garden

Reception 
Before performing an extended version of "Shine Silently" on Dutch TV show  Lofgren noted that it was a personal favorite and the single a moderate hit in Holland.

References

External links 
 

1979 albums
Nils Lofgren albums
Albums produced by Bob Ezrin
A&M Records albums